This glossary of the culture of ancient Rome includes terms used by academics studying Roman history and archaeologists excavating Roman sites.

A

B

C

D

E

F

G

H

I

J

K

L

M

N

O

P

Q

R

S

T

U

V

W

X

Y

There is no word/s.

Z

See also
Glossary of ancient Roman religion

Notes

References

Roman
Ancient Roman studies
Ancient Roman culture
Italic culture
Classical antiquity
Wikipedia glossaries using description lists